Conospermum sphacelatum  is a plant of the family proteaceae native to Queensland.

References

sphacelatum
Flora of Queensland